
The Double Concerto in A minor, Op. 102, by Johannes Brahms is a concerto for violin, cello and orchestra. The orchestra consists of 2 flutes, 2 oboes, 2 clarinets, 2 bassoons, 4 horns, 2 trumpets, timpani and strings.

Origin of the work 
The Double Concerto was Brahms' final work for orchestra. Brahms approached the project with anxiety over writing for instruments that were not his own. He wrote it for the cellist Robert Hausmann, a frequent chamber music collaborator, and his old but estranged friend, the violinist Joseph Joachim. The concerto was, in part, a gesture of reconciliation towards Joachim, after their long friendship had ruptured following Joachim's divorce from his wife Amalie. (Brahms had sided with Amalie in the dispute.)

The concerto makes use of the musical motif A–E–F, a permutation of F–A–E, which stood for a personal motto of Joachim, Frei aber einsam ("free but lonely"). Thirty-four years earlier, Brahms had been involved in a collaborative work using the F-A-E motif in tribute to Joachim: the F-A-E Sonata of 1853.

Structure 

The composition consists of three movements in the fast–slow–fast pattern typical of classical instrumental concerti:

Performance and reception 
Joachim and Hausmann performed the concerto, with Brahms at the podium, several times in its initial 1887–88 season, and Brahms gave the manuscript to Joachim, with the inscription "To him for whom it was written." Clara Schumann reacted unfavourably to the concerto, considering the work "not brilliant for the instruments".  Richard Specht also thought critically of the concerto, describing it as "one of Brahms' most inapproachable and joyless compositions".  Brahms had sketched a second concerto for violin and cello but destroyed his notes in the wake of its cold reception. Later critics have warmed to it: Donald Tovey wrote of the concerto as having "vast and sweeping humour". Its performance requires two brilliant and equally matched soloists.

Scholarly discussion 
Richard Cohn has included the first movement of this concerto in his discussions of triadic progressions from a Neo-Riemannian perspective.  Cohn has also analysed such progressions mathematically. Cohn notes several progressions that divide the octave equally into three parts, and which can be analyzed using the triadic transformations proposed by Hugo Riemann.

Discography
Jacques Thibaud and Pablo Casals, Orquestra Pau Casals  Alfred Cortot (1929).
Jascha Heifetz and Emanuel Feuermann, Philadelphia Orchestra  Eugene Ormandy (1939).
Adolf Busch and Herman Busch, French National Radio Orchestra  Paul Kletzki (live Strasbourg 1949).
Georg Kulenkampff and Enrico Mainardi, Orchestre de la Suisse Romande  Carl Schuricht (1947).
Willi Boskovsky and Emanuel Brabec, Vienna Philharmonic Orchestra  Wilhelm Furtwängler (1950 live recording).
Nathan Milstein and Gregor Piatigorsky, Philadelphia Robin Hood Dell Orchestra  Fritz Reiner (1951).
Jean Fournier and Antonio Janigro, Vienna State Opera Orchestra  Hermann Scherchen (1952).
Gioconda de Vito and Amadeo Baldovino, Philharmonia Orchestra  Rudolf Schwarz (1952).
David Oistrakh and Pierre Fournier, Philharmonia Orchestra  Alceo Galliera (1956).
Isaac Stern and Leonard Rose, Philharmonic Symphony Orchestra of New York  Bruno Walter (1956).
Zino Francescatti and Samuel Mayes, Boston Symphony Orchestra  Charles Munch (live rec. April 1956)
Zino Francescatti and Pierre Fournier, Columbia Symphony Orchestra  Bruno Walter (1960).
Zino Francescatti and Pierre Fournier, BBC Symphony Orchestra  Sir Malcolm Sargent (date of recording: 30/08/1955).
Wolfgang Schneiderhan and Enrico Mainardi, Vienna Philharmonic Orchestra  Karl Böhm (date of recording: 08/25/1957).
Jascha Heifetz and Gregor Piatigorsky, RCA Victor Symphony Orchestra  Alfred Wallenstein (1961).
Salvatore Accardo and Siegfried Palm, Orchestra Sinfonica di Roma della RTV Italiana cond Bruno Maderna (live 1961 Milan).
Wolfgang Schneiderhan and János Starker, Berlin Radio Symphony Orchestra  Ferenc Fricsay (1962).
Alfredo Campoli and André Navarra, Hallé Orchestra  John Barbirolli (1963).
Josef Suk and André Navarra, Czech Philharmonic Orchestra  Karel Ančerl (c.1963).
David Oistrakh and Mstislav Rostropovich, Moscow Philharmonic Orchestra  Kirill Kondrashin (live 1963).
David Oistrakh and Mstislav Rostropovich, Cleveland Orchestra  George Szell(1970).
Christian Ferras and Paul Tortelier, Philharmonia Orchestra  Paul Kletzki (1964).
Yehudi Menuhin and Maurice Gendron, London Symphony Orchestra  István Kertész (Bath Festival 1964).
Yehudi Menuhin and Leslie Parnas, Casals Festival Orchestra  Pablo Casals (1969).
Henryk Szeryng and János Starker, Royal Concertgebouw Orchestra  Bernard Haitink (1971).
Yan Pascal Tortelier and Paul Tortelier, BBC Symphony Orchestra  John Pritchard (1974).
Salvatore Accardo and Heinrich Schiff, Gewandhausorchester Leipzig  Kurt Masur (1979)
Itzhak Perlman and Mstislav Rostropovich, Concertgebouw Orchestra,  Bernard Haitink(1980).
Anne-Sophie Mutter and Antônio Meneses, Berlin Philharmonic Orchestra  Herbert von Karajan (1983).
Emmy Verhey and János Starker, Amsterdam Philharmonic Orchestra (nl)  Arpad Joó (1983).
Gidon Kremer and Mischa Maisky, Vienna Philharmonic Orchestra  Leonard Bernstein (1984).
Yehudi Menuhin and Paul Tortelier, London Philharmonic Orchestra  Paavo Berglund (1984).
Isaac Stern and Yo-Yo Ma, Chicago Symphony Orchestra  Claudio Abbado (1988).
Raphael Wallfisch and Lydia Mordkovitch (violin), London Symphony Orchestra, Neeme Järvi. Label Chandos (1989)
Ilya Kaler and Maria Kliegel, National Symphony Orchestra of Ireland  Andrew Constantine (1995).
Itzhak Perlman and Yo-Yo Ma, Chicago Symphony Orchestra  Daniel Barenboim (1997).
Gil Shaham and Jian Wang, Berliner Philharmoniker  Claudio Abbado (2002).
 Julia Fischer and Daniel Müller-Schott, Netherlands Philharmonic Orchestra  Yakov Kreizberg (2007).
 Renaud Capuçon and Gautier Capuçon, Gustav Mahler Jugendorchester  Myung-Whun Chung (2007).
Vadim Repin and Truls Mørk, Leipzig Gewandhaus Orchestra  Riccardo Chailly (2009).
Antje Weithaas and Maximilian Hornung, NDR Radiophilharmonie  Andrew Manze (2019).

Media

See also 
 Double Concerto for Violin and Cello
 Riemannian theory

References

External links 

Adaptation of the work as a Cello Concerto

Concertos by Johannes Brahms
Brahms
1887 compositions
Compositions in A minor
Music with dedications